Drewes's worm snake (Epacrophis drewesi) is a species of snake in the family Leptotyphlopidae. The species is native to East Africa.

Etymology
The specific name, drewesi, is in honor of American herpetologist Robert Clifton Drewes.

Geographic range
E. drewesi is endemic to Kenya.

Habitat

Behavior
E. drewesi is nocturnal and fossorial.

Reproduction
E. drewesi is oviparous.

References

Further reading
Adalsteinsson SA, Branch WR, Trape S, Vitt LJ, Hedges SB (2009). "Molecular phylogeny, classification, and biogeography of snakes of the Family Leptotyphlopidae (Reptilia, Squamata)". Zootaxa 2244: 1-50. (Epacrophis drewesi, new combination).
Spawls S, Howell K, Hinkel H, Menegon M (2018). Field Guide to East African Reptiles, Second Edition. London: Bloomsbury Natural History. 624 pp. . (Epacrophis drewesi, p. 365).
Wallach V (1996). "Leptotyphlops drewesi n. sp., a worm snake from central Kenya (Serpentes: Leptotyphlopidae)". Journal of African Zoology 110 (6): 425–431. (Leptotyphlops drewesi, new speies).

Epacrophis
Snakes of Africa
Reptiles of Kenya
Endemic fauna of Kenya
Reptiles described in 1996
Taxobox binomials not recognized by IUCN